A Phay Ta Khu Thar Ta Khu is a 1977 Burmese black-and-white drama film, directed by Maung Nanda starring Sein Myint, Zaw Lin, Swe Zin Htaik, Thida Khin Htwe and Aung Htun Lay.

Cast
Sein Myint as Chan Thar
Zaw Lin as Kyaw Zay Ya
Swe Zin Htaik as Mi Moe
Thida Khin Htwe as Daw Htwe Nge
Myint Pe as San Htoo
Aung Htun Lay as Kan Kaung

Awards

References

1977 films
1970s Burmese-language films
Films shot in Myanmar
Burmese black-and-white films
1977 drama films
Burmese drama films